Keelu Bommalu is a 1965 Indian Telugu-language film directed by C. S. Rao and produced by P. Gangadhara Rao of Hyderabad Films.

Plot
Drama of a student of religion who comes to realise he is selfish and learns to help others.

Cast
 Gummadi
 Jamuna
 Jaggayya
 Vasanthi
 Kannamba
 Mudigonda Lingamurthy

Awards
Nandi Award for Second Best Feature Film - Silver won by P. Gangadhara Rao.

Songs
 "Bottu Kaatuka Pettukuni" (Singer: P. Susheela)
 "Pillanogroviga Marithira" (Singer: P. Susheela)
"Endu Konanukonti" - Pithapuram Nageswara Rao, K. Jamuna Rani
"Keelu Bommalu" - Ghantasala

References

External links
 

1965 films
1960s Telugu-language films
Films directed by C. S. Rao
Films scored by S. P. Kodandapani